Ziad Lakhdhar is a Tunisian politician. He is the secretary-general of the Democratic Patriots' Movement (DPM) and a prominent leader of the Popular Front, a left-wing coalition of opposition parties and movements. He succeeded Chokri Belaid, who was assassinated on 6 February 2013, as secretary-general of the DPM.

References

Year of birth missing (living people)
Living people
Popular Front (Tunisia) politicians
African democratic socialists
Tunisian Arab nationalists